Kobierski (feminine Kobierska) is a Polish surname. Notable people with the surname include:

 Janusz Adam Kobierski (born 1947), Polish priest and poet
 Marcin Kobierski (born 1977), Polish canoer
 Stanislaus Kobierski (1910–1972), German footballer

Polish-language surnames